The Little masters were a group of potters and vase painters who produced vases of the Attic black-figure style featuring well-done figures in miniature. They were active in Athens approximately 560–530 BC. They mainly produced Little-master cups: lip cups, band cups, and droop cups, but were not entirely limited to such shapes. The group includes:

Potters

Anakles
Antidoros
Archeneides
Archikles
Charitaios
Chiron
Epitimos
Ergoteles
Eucheiros
Gageos
Glaukytes
Hermogenes
Hischylos
Kaulos
Kolchos
Kritomenes
Myspios
Neandros
Phrynos
Priapos
Sokles
Sondros
Taleides
Teisias
Telesias
Thrax
Thypheitides
Tlempolemos
Tleson
Xenokles
Botkin Class

Vase painters

Painter of Agora P 1241
Ano Achaïia Painter
Karithaios Painter
Centauren Painter
Neandros Painter
Oakeshott Painter
Painter of the Palermo Gorgoneion
Phrynos Painter
Sakonides
Sokles Painter
Taleides Painter
Tleson Painter
Painter of Vatican G 62
Xenokles Painter

Groups

Charon Group
Golvol Group
Group of Louvre F 81
Group of Rhodes 12264
Group of Toronto 289
Group of Vatican G 61
Group of Villa Giulia 3559

Notes

Further reading 
 John Beazley: Little-master Cups, in: Journal of Hellenic Studies 52 (1932) pp. 167–204.
 John Beazley: Attic Black-figure Vase-Painting, Oxford 1956, pp. 159–197.
 Dieter Metzler: Eine attische Kleinmeisterschale mit Töpferszenen in Karlsruhe, in: Archäologischer Anzeiger (1969) pp. 138–152.
John D. Beazley: Paralipomena. Additions to Attic black-figure vase-painters and to Attic red-figure vase-painters, Oxford 1971, pp. 67–80.
 Joan Tarlow Haldenstein: Little master cups. Studies in 6th century Attic black-figure vase painting, Dissertation University of Cincinnati 1975.
 Rudolf Wachter: Drinking inscriptions on Attic little-master cups. A catalogue (AVI 3), in: Kadmos 42 (2003) pp. 141–189.
 Peter Heesen: Drinking inscriptions on Attic little-master cups. Does size matter? A contribution to the AVI Project, in: Museum Helveticum 63 (2006) pp. 44–62.

Ancient Greek potters
Ancient Greek vase painters